SN "Nuclearelectrica" S.A. (SNN) is a partially state-owned Romanian nuclear energy company incorporated in 1998 by the reorganization of RENEL. The company is under the authority of the Ministry of Energy, and the state has 82.49% of the shares and other shareholders - 17.50% after listing the company at the stock exchange in 2013.

The field of activity of Nuclearelectrica is the manufacture of electricity, thermal energy and nuclear fuel. Nuclearelectrica is the only producer of nuclear energy in Romania.

The company has two branches:

 CNE Cernavodă branch, operates Units 1 and 2 at CNE Cernavoda and auxiliary services;
 The Nuclear Fuel Plant (FCN) of Pitești.

SNN also has 100% of the shares of project company Energonuclear, incorporated in order to implement the project for Units 3 and 4 of CNE Cernavodă.

The Cernavodă Nuclear Power Plant was designed with an initial profile of five reactors with Canadian technology, of CANDU type, with installed power of approximately 700 MW each. Until now (December 2020), 2 units have been built. Unit 1, which became commercially operational in 1996, and Unit 2, which became commercially operational in 2007, collectively ensure approximately 18% of the energy necessities of the country. The power plant began construction during the Nicolae Ceaușescu era and had several delays for various reasons. There are often proposals to finish construction of the partially built units 3, 4 and 5 either in cooperation with Candu Energy (current owner of CANDU technology patents and marketing rights) or some other pressurized heavy water reactor manufacturer. A contract between Candu Energy and EnergoNuclear, a partially owned subsidiary of Nuclearelectrica set up in 2009 to determine the future of Cernavodă units 3 and 4, to finish construction of those reactors was finally signed in late 2021.

The nuclear fuel plant Pitești FCN manufactures nuclear fuel bundles of type CANDU 6 that are necessary for the operation and production of electricity in Units 1 and 2 at Cernavodă, and in the future by doubling the production capacity, it will provide nuclear fuel also for units 3 and 4.

By the Resolution of the General Assembly of Shareholders of SNN of November 2013, the termination of the works at Unit 5 as a nuclear unit and changing its destination in order to use the existing structures in other activities of SNN.

The development of Units 3 and 4 of CNE Cernavodă is part of the energy strategy of Romania until 2030, with year 2050 as a reference, and from the National Integrated Plan in the Field of Energy and Climate Change, as nuclear energy represents a pillar of decarbonization and ensuring the energy independence of Romania.

Also, SNN is implementing the project of refurbishing Unit 1, a project which involves the extension of the lifecycle of the unit by another 30 years, under the same nuclear safety conditions.

Timeline 
 1976 Completion of the Romanian-Canadian feasibility study for the CANDU system in Romania
 1982: Pouring the first batch of concrete at the Unit 1 reactor building
 July 1990: First PRE-OSART mission at CNE Cernavodă of the International Atomic Energy Agency - IAEA in Vienna
 August 1991: Concluding the management contract for completing Unit 1 with the AECL-ANSALDO (AAC) Consortium
 May–June 1995: Loading Unit 1 with nuclear fuel
16 April 1996: First criticality of the Unit 1 reactor
 11 July 1996: First connection to the national electricity system of Unit 1 of CNE Cernavodă
2 December 1996: Unit 1 of CNE Cernavodă becomes commercially operational
30 June 1997: Full transfer of the responsibility to the managers and the operation of Unit 1 from AAC to Romanian personnel
2 July 1998: Incorporation of "Societatea Nationala Nuclearelectrica S.A". (Government Resolution no. 365/1998; Official Journal 246/03.07.1998)
18 May 2001: Signing the contract with AECL Canada and Ansaldo Nucleare for Unit 2
12 September 2007: The reactor of Unit 2 at CNE Cernavodă reached the nominal power for the first time, within the start-up tests
 26 September 2007: Operation for 10 days at nominal power
 28 September 2007: Delivering the management of Unit 2 to SN Nuclearelectrica SA
 5 October 2007: Official launch of Unit 2
 November 2010: Obtaining the approval of the European Commission for the project of Units 3 and 4, in virtue of the Euratom Treaty.
 29 November 2011: 15 years of commercial operation of Unit 1 of the nuclear power station of Cernavodă
 November 2013: Listing of SNN at the Bucharest Stock Exchange
 November 2021: signed with NuScale a contract partnership for building the first small nuclear reactors.

CNE Cernavodă Units 1 and 2 
Units 1 and 2 of CNE Cernavodă use CANDU technology.

CNE Cernavodă Units 1-5

The CANDU reactor consumes natural uranium, using heavy nuclear water (isotopic content over 99.75% D2O) as moderator and cooling agent, in two independent, separate, closed-circuit systems.

In the 4 steam generators, the heat in the primary circuit is taken over by the light water from the secondary circuit, by turning it into saturated steam. It expands in the turbine formed from a medium pressure body and 3 low pressure bodies, producing the mechanical energy required to actuate the electric generator.

On exiting the turbine, by extracting the residual heat with the help of cooling water taken from the Danube, the steam is condensed. The circuit is resumed by repumping the condensate in order to supply the steam generators.

In 2019, the two units of CNE Cernavodă produced 11,280,166 MWh. Unit 1 recorded a capacity factor of 93.86% and Unit 2 - 89.16%.

With a capacity factor of 91.6% since it became operational, Romania, with two operating nuclear units, is 1st in the world.

Pitești Nuclear Fuel Plant 

CANDU fuel is easier to produce than that of many other reactor types as the improved neutron economy of the heavy water moderator allows the use of natural uranium without  enrichment. Unlike uranium enrichment plants, a CANDU fuel plant does not produce depleted uranium as waste.

The production of CANDU nuclear fuel started in 1980, by starting up the pilot station as a fuel section within the Nuclear Research Institute (ICN) of Pitești. The Nuclear Fuel Plant was separated as a distinct entity in 1992.

In 1994, the Nuclear Fuel Plant (FCN) was authorized by AECL and Zircatec Precision Industries Inc. (Canada) as a manufacturer of CANDU 6 nuclear fuel.

In 2004–2006, with low investments, FCN Pitești doubled its production capacity in order to ensure the necessary fuel for operating two units at CNE Cernavodă.

In 2007, FCN obtained the TUV EN ISO 14001:2004 certificate for the environment management system.

Annually, FCN Pitești manufactures approximately 10,800 nuclear fuel bundles.

FCN Pitești can provide consultancy, technical support and various equipment to the companies interested in transferring nuclear fuel manufacturing technology.

Cernavodă Units 3 and 4 
Units 3 and 4 have been under conservation already since 1992. Total completion rate: approximately 15% at Unit 3 and 14% at Unit 4, consisting in civil works at the reactor building, turbine building and service building.

CNE Cernavodă Units 3 and 4

By Government Resolution no. 643/2007, the Government of Romania approved the strategy for attracting investors for building Units 3 and 4 of CNE Cernavodă, including the schedule for incorporating the new company that is responsible for completing the project.  After submitting the tenders, 6 companies were selected for the implementation of the project, and each investor obtained a percentage from the total number of shares, proportional to the invested capital: Nuclearelectrica (51%), ArcelorMittal Romania (6.2%), ČEZ Czech Republic (9.15%), GDF SUEZ Belgium (9.15%), ENEL Italy (9.15%), Iberdrola Spain (6.2%) and RWE Power Germany (9.15%).

On 29 March 2009, the project company was incorporated under the name SC EnergoNuclear SA with the Trade Register of Romania, and the management team was appointed. EnergoNuclear is a company with public-private capital.

In November 2010, the European Commission issued  a positive opinion on the project, according to the provisions of Art. 41 of the EURATOM treaty, which confirms the application of the technical and nuclear security criteria in force on EU level.

In May 2012, CNCAN issued a Comfort Letter whereby it stipulated that the project can be authorized;

In September 2012, the Feasibility Study of the project was finished, revealing the fact that the project is technically and economically feasible;

On 25 September 2013, the Resolution on the issuance of the environment approval for project "Continuing the works for building and completing Units 3 and 4 of CNE Cernavodă" was approved.

In 2011, investors GDF SUEZ, CEZ, RWE and Iberdrola withdrew from the project, and substantiated their decision by the necessity of focusing on investments in their countries of origin, because of the economic crisis.

After the remaining shareholders (ENEL and ArcelorMittal) exercised their option to withdraw from the project in December 2013, SN Nuclearelectrica SA is the sole shareholder of project company EnergoNuclear SA.

On 22 August 2014, the General Assembly of Shareholders of SNN approved the Strategy for continuing the Project of Units 3 and 4 of CNE Cernavodă by launching a competitive procedure for selecting a private investor (PI) in order to incorporate a company, namely a joint venture.  The procedure was launched on 27 August 2014, and the first stage, the qualification one, ended on 9 September 2014, with the qualification of investor China General Nuclear Power Corporation. CGN was appointed as the selected investor on 17 October 2014 by signing a Common Letter regarding the Intention to Implement the Project.

On 22 October 2015, the shareholders of SNN approved in the General Assembly of Shareholders the signing of the Memorandum of Understanding on the development, building, operation and decommissioning of Units 3 and 4 of CNE Cernavodă, which was signed by the parties on 9 November 2015. On 8 May 2019, SNN and its selected partner CGN signed the Investors' Agreement in preliminary form, a prior step before the incorporation of the project company responsible for the implementation of the project. The term of the joint venture will be 2 years.

At the General Assembly of Shareholders of SNN of 12 June 2020, the topics of the agenda proposed by the majority shareholder, the Ministry of Economy, Energy and Business Environment, were approved, namely:

1.     Repealing of the "Strategy for the continuation of the Units 3 and 4 Project from Cernavodă NPP by organizing an investor selection procedure" (2014) and of the "Revised strategy for the continuation of the Units 3 and 4 Project from Cernavodă NPP by organizing an investor selection procedure" (2018).

2.     Authorizing the SNN Board of Directors to initiate the procedures/steps/actions regarding the termination of negotiations with CGN, as well as the termination of the legal effects (by agreement of the parties, denunciation, etc.) of the following documents: "Memorandum of Understanding on the development, construction, operation and decommissioning of Units 3 and 4 of CNE Cernavodă (MoU) and (ii) Investor Agreement in preliminary form".

3.     Mandating the Board of Directors of the SNN to initiate the necessary steps for the analysis and crystallization of strategic options for the construction of new nuclear power generation capacities.

Regarding future actions, namely the actions that are necessary for continuing the Project of Units 3 and 4, according to the obligations related to the status of listed company and of the Articles of Incorporation, SNN will inform and propose for its shareholders' vote any such actions, in the full transparency of the manner of managing the responsibilities of the statutory bodies of SNN.

Units 3 and 4 will increase the contribution of nuclear energy to the national energy system on the level of 2030, by using the existing capabilities and capitalizing the operating experience and the capability of the industry.

Following the termination of the previous round of negotiations, Romania and US have initialized the Intergovernmental Agreement for cooperation to develop the civil nuclear sector in Romania in October 2020, including Cernavodă NPP Unit 3 and 4 Project. Based on official governmental statements, the Project is to be developed under a Euro-Atlantic consortium, including US, Canada and France support. This important project will double Romania's nuclear capacity in order to meet increasing power demand, enhance security of supply and reach climate change targets. The Project is contemplated by the all scenarios of "Romania’s Energy Strategy until 2030, with the perspective of 2050", as well as in the "National Integrated Plan in the field of Energy and Climate Change (PNIESC) 2021-2030". Unit 3 has to be operational by 2030, and Unit 4 soon after 2030.

Nuclear safety 
At CNE Cernavodă nuclear safety is priority 1. There were no incidents or events that would affect nuclear safety at CNE Cernavoda.

Nuclear security as a field is a set of technical and organizational measures designed to:

- Ensure the operation of nuclear installations under safety conditions;

- To prevent and limit their damage;

- To ensure the protection of the personnel, the population and the environment against radiation or radioactive contamination

The nuclear security philosophy of CANDU 6 nuclear power stations is based on these considerations. This philosophy is based on three fundamental principles, namely:

1.     The in-depth protection principle, which consists of reaching a high level of technical performance and nuclear security, by raising multiple physical barriers against releases of radioactivity in the environment (the nuclear fuel matrix; the fuel element sheath; the under-pressure chamber of the primary circuit: the envelope system; the exclusion area).

2.     The ALARA principle, whose objectives must ensure the protection of the operating personnel, the population and the environment, by setting and maintaining adequate protection against radiological risks.

3.     The grouping and separating principle. The grouping the systems with security functions into two groups was approved within the project of the power plant in order to ensure the protection of CNE against common-cause events which would cause large destructions in the nuclear power station, at the same time.

Environmental protection 
The environment monitoring programs aim to control emissions and verify the compliance with the limits and requirements imposed by the regulation and control authorities, both radiologically and conventionally (non-radiologically).

The Nuclear Power Plant has implemented, starting with the commissioning of Unit 1, an environmental radioactivity monitoring program, based on the requirements of the national legislation and internationally validated practices in the nuclear industry. In compliance with international practices, the plant built and fitted its own Environmental Radioactivity Control Laboratory and established a network of sampling points or positioning continuous monitoring stations, in different locations within a radius of 30 km around the plant.

CNE Cernavodă daily analyzes the following sample types: air (particles under the form of aerosols, iodine, water vapors), soil, sediment, atmospheric deposits, food samples (milk, fish, pork, beef and chicken, vegetables, fruits, eggs, cereals) surface water, drinking water, groundwater, rainwater, infiltration water from the Cernavodă area, and publishes the results at the information centers and information panels in the city.

Measurements of the external gamma dose are also carried out. A network of 62 monitoring points with thermal-luminescent dosimeters for the measurement of the gamma dose has been established around the power plant and across an area with a radius of 30 km. Gamma spectrometry analyzes, global beta analyzes and specific assays for the detection of tritium and C-14 are carried out through liquid scintillation spectrometry. Food samples for the analysis are procured from local producers or from the agri-food market in Cernavoda, Seimeni, Medgidia, Satu Nou. The results of the environment's radiological monitoring are compared with the results of the pre-operational environmental monitoring program carried out in the period 1984 – 1996. Up to now no changes in the radioactivity of the environment in the area of Cernavodă city have been detected, in relation to the period prior to the commissioning of the nuclear unit.

Refurbishment of Unit 1 of Cernavodă NPP 
Any nuclear unit has a limited lifetime, set by the project. For units with CANDU technology, the lifetime designed is 210.000 hours of operation at rated power, which, at a capacity factor of 80%, translates into an economic operational use lifecycle of approximately 30 years. The main components and structures that are limiting the lifetime are fuel channels, feeders and the envelope of the nuclear reactor.

Given the major costs of building new large production units, by using nuclear technology, the refurbishing alternative is attractive for the owner of a nuclear unit. The main advantage of such an option is that, at the end of the refurbishing, the owner is in possession of a nuclear unit that is capable of operating at the project parameters for another lifecycle (25–30 years), at costs of approximately 40% of the costs incurred with building a new similar unit. Additionally, refurbishing is more advantageous than building a new unit as the necessary duration for the actual refurbishing works is shorter, estimated, based on the information available at the moment, between 24 and 30 months.

The refurbishing of Unit 1 is a complex project started in 2013, with an allocated project budget and team.

Extending the number of hours of initial operation of Unit 1 involves, first of all, the drafting of studies and analyses, showing how many hours of nominal power the unit can reach, by fully complying with the nuclear security requirements and norms.

A longer operation period has positive effects on the preparation and performance of the refurbishing works by:

·       extending the duration for the company to accumulate the necessary funds for the project;

·       better project preparation and better organization of the works to be performed during the stoppage.

Unit 1 will be refurbished in 3 stages:

Electricity sales 
As a producer of energy on the electricity market of Romania, SN Nuclearelectrica SA sells on the wholesale market the energy produced by the two units of CNE Cernavodă.

On the competition-based market, sales are done in compliance with the requirements of Law no. 123/2012 on electricity and natural gas, based on public and non-discriminatory offers, awarded through tenders organized by OPCOM (Romanian Electricity and Gas Market Operator).

Nuclearelectrica sells energy on the following markets:

·       On the regulated market - the prices and quantities are set by ANRE. In 2019, SNN sold 1,377 GWh on the regulated market at the price of 188.33 RON/MWh (without Tg), according to ANRE Resolution no. 326/February 25, 2019

·       On the competition market by energy sale-purchase contracts on the markets managed by the market operator OPCOM S.A.: mainly PCCB – LE and PCCB - NC (centralized market for bilateral electricity contracts with the method trading contracts by extended tender procedures and the method of trading contracts according to which contracts are distributed by continuous negotiations), PZU (following-day market) and PCSU (universal service centralized market).

·       On the Balancing market administered by Transelectrica, in case of positive unbalance;

·       Through negotiated sale-purchase contracts. Nuclearelectrica has only one such contract concluded with Transelectrica in the quality of captive consumer for the consumption of the Cernavodă 400 kV station (approximately 1.000 MWh/year).

Local community 
The acceptance degree of nuclear energy in Romania is high, especially for new investment projects (Units 3 and 4 - 75%, refurbishing of Unit 1 - 68%), as Romanians believe that the low price of nuclear energy and the energy independence of Romania are

Saint Mary bridge built over the Danube - Black Sea canal

the most important advantages of nuclear energy.

Nuclearelectrica has gotten involved in increasing the life quality of the people of Cernavoda, by the emergency social program for the improvement of living conditions for Cernavoda and for the construction and operating personnel of the plant.

The works indicated in the legislative act are performed as complementary works to the project "Cernavoda Nuclear Power Station 5 x 700 MWh" and are transferred, without payment to the beneficiary indicated in the legislative act.

At the end of 2008, 11 important projects were completed and commissioned to the beneficiary, the local community. Currently, one project is in progress.

Completed and received works:

1.1 Food store at the location of the nuclear power station

1.2 Kindergarten

1.3 Drinking water station (pumping and treatment)

1.4 Modernization of intersections and streets

1.5 Central heating networks

1.6 "Saint Mary" bridge for the access of cars to the Cernavoda station and to the Fetesti-Cernavoda Highway, over the Danube - Black Sea canal

1.7 Energy High School of Cernavoda

1.8 Hospital with 100 beds and a polyclinic in Cernavoda

1.9 Station for the purification of used and residual water

1.10 Four drinking water fountains

1.11 Apartment complex

In progress:

1.1 Training and recreational center for youth and children in Cernavoda. Until now, the location has been prepared in order to start the construction works.

SNN is also implementing an intense corporate social responsibility program. In 2019, a budget of RON 10,000,000 was allocated for social projects, which impacted 2,000,000 Romanians.

The RSC policy of SNN has the purpose the establishment of strategic orientation and priority directions of its involvement in philanthropic-type actions, charitable and humanitarian for the benefit of the community, in areas nearby nuclear objectives operated by SNN (Cernavoda and Pitesti), as well as nationwide. SNN considers that durable development of the company and the sustainability of its long-term development points are strongly connected with the development, education, information, acceptance and public support before the nuclear energy in Romania. Thus, investing a share of the annual profit of SNN in RSC actions constitutes an integral part of the development strategy of the company for 2015–2025.

RSC objectives:

·       Creating and supporting a sustainable business model, with responsible management and global policies adapted to local issues;

·       Increasing the level of confidence and support for SNN's business model;

·       Addressing the real issues of the community;

·       Starting the change we want to see in the Romanian society;

·       Development of relations with the local community, NGOs, opinion leaders;

·       Attracting young specialists;

·       Increasing the level of acceptance for the use of nuclear energy in Romania and for SNN's investment projects;

·       Alignment to RSC international standards and good practices practiced by the companies;

See also

 Energy in Romania
 Nuclear power in Romania

References

External links

Nuclear power companies of Romania
Companies listed on the Bucharest Stock Exchange